Sauria is the clade containing the most recent common ancestor of archosaurs (such as crocodilians, dinosaurs, etc.) and lepidosaurs (lizards and kin), and all its descendants. Since most molecular phylogenies recover turtles as more closely related to archosaurs than to lepidosaurs as part of Archelosauria, Sauria can be considered the crown group of diapsids, or reptiles in general. Depending on the systematics, Sauria includes all modern reptiles or most of them (including birds, a type of archosaur) as well as various extinct groups.

Sauria lies within the larger total group Sauropsida, which also contains various stem-reptiles which are more closely related to reptiles than to mammals. Prior to its modern usage, "Sauria" was used as a name for the suborder occupied by lizards, which before 1800 were considered crocodilians.

Systematics
Recent genomic studies and comprehensive studies in the fossil record suggest that turtles are closely related to archosaurs, not to the pre-Saurian parareptiles as previously thought. In cladistic analysis of 2018, Pantestudines (turtles and close relatives) were placed within Diapsida but outside of Sauria.

Synapomorphies
The synapomorphies or characters that unite the clade Sauria also help them be distinguished from stem-saurians in Diapsida or stem-reptiles in clade Sauropsida in the following categories based on the following regions of the body.
Cephalad Region
Dorsal origin of temporal musculature
Loss of caniniform region in maxillary tooth row
External nares close to the midline
Postparietal absent
Squamosal mainly restricted to top of skull
The occipital flange of the squamosal is little exposed on the occiput
Anterior process of squamosal narrow
Quadrate exposed laterally
Unossified dorsal process of stapes
Stapes slender
Trunk Region
Sacral ribs oriented laterally
Ontogenetic fusion of caudal ribs
Trunk ribs mostly single headed
Pectoral Region
Cleithrum absent
Pelvic Region
Modified ilium
Limb Region
Tubular bone lost
Entepicondylar foramen absent
Radius as long as ulna
Small proximal carpals and tarsal
Fifth distal tarsal absent
Short and stout fifth or hooked metatarsal
Perforating foramen of manus lost

However, some of these characters might be lost or modified in several lineages, particularly among birds and turtles; it is best to see these characters as the ancestral features that were present in the ancestral saurian.

Phylogeny
The cladogram shown below follows the most likely result found by an analysis of turtle relationships using both fossil and genetic evidence by M.S. Lee, in 2013. This study found Eunotosaurus, usually regarded as a turtle relative, to be only very distantly related to turtles in the clade Parareptilia.

The cladogram below follows the most likely result found by another analysis of turtle relationships, this one using only fossil evidence, published by Rainer Schoch and Hans-Dieter Sues in 2015. This study found Eunotosaurus to be an actual early stem-turtle, though other versions of the analysis found weak support for it as a parareptile.

The cladogram below follows the analysis of Li et al. (2018). It places turtles within Diapsida but outside of Sauria (the Lepidosauromorpha + Archosauromorpha clade).

References

 
Reptile taxonomy
Tetrapod unranked clades
Permian reptiles
Extant Permian first appearances
Guadalupian first appearances